Yorkshire South was a European Parliament constituency covering most of South Yorkshire in England.

Prior to its uniform adoption of proportional representation in 1999, the United Kingdom used first-past-the-post for the European elections in England, Scotland and Wales. The European Parliament constituencies used under that system were smaller than the later regional constituencies and only had one Member of the European Parliament each.

The area was later included in the Yorkshire and the Humber European Parliament Constituency, which was represented by seven members in 1999–2004 and six from 2004 onwards.

Boundaries
1979–1984: Barnsley; Dearne Valley; Doncaster; Don Valley; Penistone; Rotherham; Rother Valley.

1984–1999: Barnsley Central; Barnsley East; Doncaster Central; Doncaster North; Don Valley; Rotherham; Rother Valley; Wentworth.

Members of the European Parliament

Results

References

External links
 David Boothroyd's United Kingdom Election Results

European Parliament constituencies in England (1979–1999)
Politics of South Yorkshire
Political history of Yorkshire
History of South Yorkshire
1979 establishments in England
1999 disestablishments in England
Constituencies established in 1979
Constituencies disestablished in 1999